Haveringland is a village and civil parish in the English county of Norfolk about  north-west of Norwich.
For the purposes of local government, it falls within the district of Broadland.

Its church, St Peter, is one of 124 existing round-tower churches in Norfolk.

Notes

External links

St Peter's on the European Round Tower Churches Website

Broadland
Villages in Norfolk
Civil parishes in Norfolk